Mairia robusta is a tufted, white-woolly, perennial, herbaceous plant of up to  high, that is assigned to the family Asteraceae. It has large, robust, hard and leathery leaves, with a white woolly hairy, nontransparent underside, while the felty hairs on the top are lost with age. Only at a few occasions, flowers have been observed, in June, October and December, always after a fire. The flower heads sit individually at the tip of white-woolly scapes, with 14–16 purplish pink to white ray florets surrounding a yellow disc. M. robusta is an endemic species that is restricted to rocky mountain slopes in the Western Cape province of South Africa.

Taxonomy 
It was first recognised as a separate taxon by Ulricke Zinnecker-Wiegand in 2011, who regarded it a subspecies and named it M. hirsuta subsp. robusta. In 2012, John Manning and Peter Goldblatt raised it to the rank of species making the combination M. robusta.

Description 
Its leaves are all in a rosettes at the base. The upper surface is initially woolly, sometimes white-woolly, but the hairs are lost with age. The lower surface has two layers of hairs, a dense, persistent, soft, white or pinkish, cobweb-like layer that is overlaid by longer woolly hairs. The lower leaf surface is not visible through the layers of hairs.

The bracts that jointly surround the florets in the same head form a broadly bell-shaped involucre of about 3 cm (1.4 in) in diameter. The line-shaped bracts have the same indumentum as the underside of the leaves, except for the (eventually) hairless base of the inner bracts. They are arranged in five to six whorls, each 11–17 mm (0.45–0.67 in) long and -1 mm (0.03–0.06 in) wide, with purplish, pointed or stretched tips. In this species, staminodes in the ray florets are absent. The ray florets encircle many yellow disc florets. The disc florets contain both inferior ovaries topped by a forked style and five fertile anthers that form a tube around the style shaft.

Surrounding the base of the corollas of both ray and disc florets are two whorls of white to straw-coloured pappus bristles. The pappus extends beyond the disc floret tubes. The cypselae of both ray and disc florets are covered with many shiny yellowish glands. The seed skin has no further adornment.

Differences with  
Mairia robusta can be distinguished from M. hirsuta by its large, robust, hard and leathery leaves, with a white woolly hairy, nontransparent underside.

Distribution, ecology and conservation 
Mairia robusta can be found from Bainskloof Pass in the north, through Stellenbosch Mountain and the Hottentots Holland Mountains, to the coast near the Kogelberg in the south. It grows on the upper rocky slopes near the summit in a fynbos vegetation.

References

External links 
 Photos on iNaturalist

robusta
Endemic flora of South Africa
Plants described in 2011